Sir Anthony Francis Seldon  (born 2 August 1953) is a British educator and contemporary historian. As an author, he is known in part for his political biographies of Margaret Thatcher, John Major, Tony Blair, Gordon Brown, David Cameron and Theresa May. He was the 13th Master (headmaster) of Wellington College, one of Britain's co-educational independent boarding schools. He was Vice-Chancellor of the University of Buckingham from 2015 to 2020, when he was succeeded by James Tooley. In 2009, he set up The Wellington Academy, the first state school to carry the name of its founding independent school. Before that, he was head of Brighton College.

Seldon is the author or editor of more than 45 books on contemporary history, politics and education. He was the co-founder and first director of the Centre for Contemporary British History, is the co-founder of Action for Happiness, is a governor of the Royal Shakespeare Company, and is on the board of a number of charities and educational bodies.

He is honorary historical adviser to 10 Downing Street and a member of the First World War Centenary Culture Committee. Seldon was knighted in the 2014 Birthday Honours for services to education and modern political history.

Early life and education

Seldon was born in Stepney, the youngest son of economist Arthur Seldon (born Abraham Margolis), who co-founded the Institute of Economic Affairs and directed academic affairs at the think tank for 30 years. His father was the child of Jewish immigrants who fled anti-semitic pogroms in Russia.

Seldon was educated first at Bickley Park School, then Tonbridge School, followed by Worcester College, Oxford, where he received a BA degree in Politics, Philosophy and Economics. He then obtained a PhD degree in Economics at the London School of Economics in 1981. He has an MBA degree from the Polytechnic of Central London. He qualified as a schoolteacher at King's College London.

Career

Seldon's first teaching appointment was at Whitgift School in Croydon in 1983. He became Head of Politics and taught in the Sixth Form there. In 1989 he returned to his old school, Tonbridge, and became Head of History and General Studies. In 1993 he was appointed Deputy Headmaster and, ultimately, Acting Headmaster of St Dunstan's College in London. He then became Headmaster of Brighton College from September 1997 until he joined Wellington College in January 2006 as its 13th Master. He became Executive Principal at The Wellington Academy (a separate school) in 2013.

He took a three-month sabbatical from January to March 2014 (leaving Wellington to be run in the interim by his Second Master, Robin Dyer, who as Acting Master, stated it would be "business as usual"). Dr Seldon announced on 23 April 2014 that he would be leaving Wellington College in the summer of 2015, after nearly ten years as the 13th Master.

In September 2015, he replaced Terence Kealey as Vice-Chancellor of University of Buckingham, the first private university in Britain.

In March 2023, he replaced Emma Pattison as Head Master of Epsom College, following her unexpected death.

History, politics and other writing

Seldon's books include Churchill's Indian Summer (1981), which won a Best First Work Prize; Major, A Political Life (1997); The Powers Behind the Prime Minister (1999) co-written with Professor Dennis Kavanagh; 10 Downing Street: The Illustrated History (2000); The Foreign Office: The Illustrated History Of The Place And Its People (2001); Blair (2004); Blair Unbound (2007), Trust (2009); Brown at 10 (2010) with Guy Lodge; Public Schools and The Great War (2013) with David Walsh; The Architecture of Diplomacy: The British Ambassador's Residence in Washington (2014) with Daniel Collings; and Cameron at 10 (2015) with Peter Snowdon. He has edited many books, including the series The Thatcher Effect (1989); The Major Effect (1994); The Blair Effect (2001); The Blair Effect 2001–2005 (2005); Blair's Britain (2007);, The Coalition Effect (2015) with Dr Mike Finn, The Cabinet Office 1916-2016; The Birth of Modern British Government, Biteback 2016, The Fouth Education Revolution with Oladimeji Abidoye, Buckingham University Press, 2018, May at 10, with Raymond Newell, Biteback, 2019, Public Schools and the Second World War, with David Walsh, Pen &Sword, 2020

Other edited books include Ruling Performance, with Professor Peter Hennessy and Conservative Century, with Professor Stuart Ball. He has written a number of booklets on education, including Private and Public Education: The Divide Must End (2000); Partnership not Paternalism (2001); An End To Factory Schools (2010); The Politics of Optimism (2012); and School United (2014). His 2011 Cass Lecture was published as 'Why Schools? Why Universities?' He also founded two journals, Contemporary British History (as Contemporary Record) and Twentieth Century British History. During his time at Brighton College, Seldon wrote Brave New City: Brighton & Hove Past, Present, Future, an analysis of the city of Brighton and Hove focused principally on its buildings.

Work in education

Seldon is a head teacher and appears on television and radio and in the press, and has written regularly for national newspapers including The Times, The Sunday Times, The Daily Telegraph, The Independent and The Guardian. His views on education have been sought by the government and political parties, with Seldon promoting co-education, the International Baccalaureate, independent education, the teaching of happiness and well-being, and "all-round" education.

Seldon has promoted well-being or happiness classes, which he introduced at Wellington College in 2006, and campaigned for a holistic, personalised approach to education rather than what he calls "factory schools." He is a proponent of the Harkness table teaching approach used in the US and the 'Middle Years' approach of the IB, as well a more international approach to education, including a focus on modern languages teaching and setting up sister schools in China.On Friday 17 February 2023, he was announced as the interim head of Epsom College, beginning in March 2023, following the death of the previous head, Emma Pattison.

Achievements and awards

Seldon has honorary doctorates or fellowships from the University of Buckingham, the University of Brighton and Richmond University and is a former Professor of Education at the College of Teachers. He is a Fellow of the Royal Historical Society (FRHistS) and of the Royal Society of Arts (FRSA). He was appointed a Fellow of King's College London (FKC) in 2013. He was knighted in the Queen's 2014 Birthday Honours list.

Other work

In 1986 Seldon co-founded, with Professor Peter Hennessy, the Institute of Contemporary British History, a body whose aim is to promote research into, and the study of, British history since 1945. Seldon is a co-founder of Action for Happiness with Richard Layard (Baron Layard), and Geoff Mulgan. Seldon is also a patron of The Iris Project, which runs literacy schemes through Latin in schools in deprived urban areas and of DrugFAM, which supports families affected by a loved one's abuse of drugs or alcohol.

He was a Board Member of the Royal Shakespeare Company and was Executive Producer of the 2017 film version of Journey's End.
He is the Deputy Chair and instigator of the Times Education Commission, former Chair of the Comment Awards, President of the International Positive Education Network (IPEN), Chair of the National Archives Trust and he was the Originator of the Via Sacra/Western Front Way Walk.

Television and radio

Among his television work, he has presented In Search of Tony Blair (Channel 4, 2004) and Trust Politics (BBC Two, 2010).

Family
Seldon was married to Joanna Pappworth, who died from endocrinal cancer in December 2016. Joanna was the daughter of medical ethicist Maurice Henry Pappworth. Anthony and Joanna met at Oxford, married in 1982, and had three children: Jessica, Susannah and Adam. In 2022 he married Sarah Sayer; she had been a language teacher at Wellington College.

References

External links 
 
 

1953 births
Living people
People from Stepney
People educated at Tonbridge School
Academics of the University of Buckingham
Alumni of Worcester College, Oxford
Alumni of King's College London
Fellows of King's College London
Alumni of the London School of Economics
Alumni of the University of Westminster
English biographers
English historians
English Jews
Headmasters of Brighton College
Masters of Wellington College, Berkshire
Knights Bachelor
Heads of schools in London
Fellows of the Royal Historical Society
Heads of schools in England
People associated with the University of Buckingham
Schoolteachers from Berkshire
Schoolteachers from Wiltshire